Kreuzberg Church, Schwandorf is a Catholic parish church, monastic church and pilgrimage church dedicated to Mary Help of Christians on the Kreuzberg ("Hill of the Cross") in Schwandorf in Bavaria, Germany.

History 
The first chapel on the Kreuzberg was built by the townsfolk between 1678 and 1680 to house an image of the Virgin Mary (a replica of the image of 'Mariahilf' by Lucas Cranach the Elder in Innsbruck Cathedral), and quickly developed as a destination of pilgrimage, to the extent that as early as 1697–1699 the chapel had to be enlarged. Another extension took place in 1784.

The Baroque church was almost completely destroyed in a bombing raid in 1945, although the image of Maria remained intact. From 1949 to 1952 it was rebuilt in a modern style.

The church serves not only as a place of pilgrimage but also as a parish church and as the church of the nearby Carmelite convent.

External links 

 Kreuzberg parish, Schwandorf
 Pictures of Kreuzberg Church

Buildings and structures in Schwandorf (district)
Pilgrimage churches in Germany
Roman Catholic churches in Bavaria